Hornepayne Municipal Airport  is located  south southeast of Hornepayne, Ontario Canada. It was opened in 1977.

See also
Hornepayne Water Aerodrome

References

Registered aerodromes in Algoma District